The Church of St. Roch is a Roman Catholic parish church in the Roman Catholic Archdiocese of New York, located at 602 Port Richmond Avenue, Staten Island, New York City. It was established in 1922. It is sometimes confused with St. Roch's Church St. in the Bronx, which was established in 1899.

History
St. Roch Church began as a mission of Our Lady of Mount Carmel Church. The parish was founded in September 1922; Fr Catello Terrone was the first pastor. The altar stone held relics of St. Roch, St. Anthony, St. Lucy, St. Rita and St. Ann. Around 1928 the congregation had grown sufficiently that parishioners went door to door to selling "bricks" for $1 to finance a larger building to replace the small wooden church. The new church building was dedicated in 1929.

In 2015, the parish of St Roch merged with St. Adalbert.

Pastors
 Fr. Catello Terrone, 1922 - 1949
 Fr Pasquale Cannizzaro, 1950 - March 1972
 Fr. Francis Massarone, 1972 - 1983
 Father Alfred Pucci, September 1983 
 Fr. Leo R. Prince
 Fr. James H. Hauver, 2011 - 2016

School
Before the opening of the parish school, students were taught in the parish hall. The school was dedicated by Francis Cardinal Spellman in May 1960. The school was staffed by the Sisters of St. John the Baptist.
After almost a decade a declining enrollment, it was among twenty-seven designated by the Archdiocese of New York to close in June 2011.

References

External links
 St. Adalbert - St. Roch Parish website

Christian organizations established in 1922
Roman Catholic churches in Staten Island
Defunct schools in New York City
Catholic elementary schools in Staten Island
Private middle schools in Staten Island
1922 establishments in New York City